Jungangno station may refer to the following railroad stations in South Korea.

 Jungangno station (Daegu Metro), a station of Daegu Metro Line 1
 Jungangno station (Daejeon Metro), a station of Daejeon Metro Line 1